Innocent Man may refer to:

Literature
 An Innocent Man, a 1988 novel by Sandra Kitt
 The Innocent Man: Murder and Injustice in a Small Town, a nonfiction book by John Grisham

Film and TV 
 An Innocent Man (film), a 1989 film directed by Peter Yates
 The Innocent Man (South Korean TV series), a 2012 television series
 The Innocent Man (2018 TV series), American docu-series on Netflix
 "An Innocent Man", a 1993 episode of Walker, Texas Ranger
 "An Innocent Man", a 1994 episode of Pie in the Sky
 "An Innocent Man", a 2004 episode of Jack & Bobby
 "An Innocent Man", a 2010 episode of The Deep End
 "An Innocent Man" (Arrow), a 2012 episode of Arrow
 "The Innocent Man", an episode of Boston Legal
 "He Kane Hewaʻole", unofficially translated as "An Innocent Man", an episode of Hawaii Five-0

Music

Albums
 Innocent Man (Mark Morrison album), 2006
 Innocent Man, a 1990 album by Wayne Wade
 An Innocent Man, a 1983 album by Billy Joel

Songs
 "An Innocent Man" (song), a 1983 single by Billy Joel from the album An Innocent Man
 "Innocent Man (Misunderstood)", a 2007 single by Cassidy
 "Innocent Man", a song from Sherrié Austin album Words
 "Innocent Man", a song from Human (Rag'n'Bone Man album) 2017